Bisheh Deraz (also Romanized as Bīsheh Derāz and Bīsheh Darāz; also known as Beshādarāz) is a village in Anaran Rural District, in the Central District of Dehloran County, Ilam Province, Iran. At the 2006 census, its population was 577, in 117 families. The village is populated by kurds.

References 

Populated places in Dehloran County
Luri settlements in Ilam Province